The 2021 Coventry City Council election took place on 6 May 2021 to elect members of Coventry City Council in England. This was on the same day as other local elections, including the West Midlands mayoral election. One-third of the council's seats were up for election.

Results

Ward results

Bablake

Binley and Willenhall

Cheylesmore

Earlsdon

Foleshill

Henley

Holbrook

Longford

Lower Stoke

Radford

Sherbourne

St Michael's

Upper Stoke

Wainbody

Westwood

Whoberley

Woodlands

Wyken

References 

Coventry City Council elections
Coventry